Nat Temple (18 July 1913 – 30 May 2008) was an English big band leader, and a clarinet and saxophone player.

Amongst many others, he worked with Syd Roy, Harry Roy, Geraldo, Ambrose, Joe Daniels, and Lew Stone.

Career
He was born Nathan Temple, the son of a tailor in Stepney, London. Temple formed his own band in 1944, and worked with Benny Lee, Frankie Vaughan, Joy Nichols, Lita Roza, David Whitfield, Anne Shelton, Beryl Davis, Julie Andrews and The Keynotes.

After World War II, he worked with Bernard Braden and Barbara Kelly on Breakfast with Braden, along with the BBC announcer, Ronald Fletcher. His band also played on the radio show Music While You Work until 1983.  
 
On television he provided the band for Crackerjack with Eamonn Andrews, as well as Nuts in May with Frankie Howerd, The Time of Your Life with Noel Edmonds, The Russell Harty Show, Tune Times With Temple, A Jolly Good Time, Dance Music Through the Ages and Starstruck.

Other people who worked with Temple included Eartha Kitt, Petula Clark, George Shearing, Larry Grayson, Fred Perry, Joyce Grenfell, Matt Monro, Kenneth Horne, Mel Tormé and Paul Daniels.

Personal life
Temple was married to Freda for over 62 years. She died on 5 June 2005. They had four daughters and six grandchildren.

He stopped playing live around 2004, and lived at home, near Woking, Surrey.

Nat Temple died at home on 30 May 2008.

References

 Full article donated by Lynda Temple (daughter), text reproduced by permission of Edmund Whitehouse of "Evergreen". Source: "Evergreen", Summer 2003, pages 32–36.

External links 
 Biography and funeral tributes at his son-in-law's website
 Biography at www.shmuelbennachum.com
 Recordings, MP3s, downloadable

Announcements 
 Announcement in The Times
 Announcement in The Stage

Obituaries 
 Obituary in The Daily Telegraph
 Obituary in The Guardian
  Obituary in The Independent
 Obituary in The Times
 Obituary in The Stage

Others 
 from Anthony Hacking, QC, in The Times

1913 births
2008 deaths
20th-century British male musicians
20th-century clarinetists
20th-century English musicians
20th-century saxophonists
Big band bandleaders
British jazz bandleaders
English jazz clarinetists
English Jews
Musicians from London
People from Stepney